The 149th New York State Legislature, consisting of the New York State Senate and the New York State Assembly, met from January 6 to April 23, 1926, during the fourth year of Al Smith's second tenure as Governor of New York, in Albany.

Background
Under the provisions of the New York Constitution of 1894, re-apportioned in 1917, 51 Senators and 150 assemblymen were elected in single-seat districts; senators for a two-year term, assemblymen for a one-year term. The senatorial districts consisted either of one or more entire counties; or a contiguous area within a single county. The counties which were divided into more than one senatorial district were New York (nine districts), Kings (eight), Bronx (three), Erie (three), Monroe (two), Queens (two) and Westchester (two). The Assembly districts were made up of contiguous area, all within the same county.

At this time there were two major political parties: the Republican Party and the Democratic Party.

Elections
The New York state election, 1925, was held on November 3. No statewide elective offices were up for election.

Assemblywoman Rhoda Fox Graves (Rep.), of Gouverneur, a former school teacher who after her marriage became active in women's organisations and politics, was re-elected, and remained the only woman legislator.

Sessions
The Legislature met for the regular session at the State Capitol in Albany on January 6, 1926; and adjourned on April 23.

Joseph A. McGinnies (Rep.) was re-elected Speaker.

State Senate

Districts

Members
The asterisk (*) denotes members of the previous Legislature who continued in office as members of this Legislature.

Note: For brevity, the chairmanships omit the words "...the Committee on (the)..."

Employees
 Clerk: Ernest A. Fay
 Sergeant-at-Arms: Charles R. Hotaling

State Assembly

Assemblymen
Note: For brevity, the chairmanships omit the words "...the Committee on (the)..."

Employees
 Clerk: Fred W. Hammond

Notes

Sources
 Members of the New York Senate (1920s) at Political Graveyard
 Members of the New York Assembly (1920s) at Political Graveyard
 1926 COMMITTEE MEMBERS NAMED in The Cornell Daily Sun on January 12, 1926

149
1926 in New York (state)
1926 U.S. legislative sessions